The BMW E32 is the second generation of the BMW 7 Series luxury cars and was produced from 1986 until 1994. It replaced the E23 and was initially available with straight-six or V12 powerplants. In 1992, V8 engines became available. From its inception, the E32 was among the most technologically advanced series of cars in its day.

The E32 introduced numerous features including adaptive suspension (EDC), traction control, two available wheelbases (i and iL), and dual-zone climate control.

Other automotive passenger vehicles features introduced with the E32 included: projector lens headlamps (1986); double glazing windows (1991); HID (Xenon) headlamps (1991).

E32 also introduced BMW's first V8 engine since the BMW 501/502, last produced in 1962, and their first V12 engine, which was also Germany's first post-war V12 engine for a passenger vehicle.

In 1994, the E32 was replaced by the E38, a clear evolution of the E32.

Development and production 
Styling was by chief stylist Ercole Spada and Hans Kerschbaum working under chief designer Claus Luthe. Design work began in late 1979. By 1983, 1:1 scale models were presented and frozen in October 1984 for production which was scheduled in June 1986.

Production of the E32 7 series started with the 735i in June 1986 and the 730i in December 1986, concluding in April 1994 with a total of 311,068 units built.

Features 

Some luxury options featured on the E32 include integrated telephone and fax machines, a wine cooler, electronically adjustable rear seats and radio controls for rear passengers (exclusive to the 750iL).

In 1991, first series-production low beam Xenon high-intensity discharge headlamps (Litronic, only low beam) were introduced on the 750iL. Other safety features include a system that automatically increased spring pressure on the windscreen wipers to keep them firmly pressed on the glass at Motorway speeds.

The E32 was the first BMW available with traction control (marketed as Automatic Stability Control, though not considered stability control by more modern standards). Initial versions of ASC reduced wheelspin by reducing engine power, while later versions (ASC+T) also applied the rear brakes.

The E32 was also available in a long-wheelbase version (indicated by an 'L' from German Lang, after the model number) with an extra  of rear leg room..

Engines 

Over its lifespan, the E32 7 Series was produced with straight-six, V8 and V12 gasoline engines.

The launch models consisted of the 730i/iL and 735i/iL, which were powered by the M30 straight-6 engine. Also available at the E32 launch was the 750i/iL, which was the first BMW ever sold with a V12 engine.

In 1991, BMW began production of its first V8 engine since the end of BMW 501/502 production in 1962. This M60 V8 was introduced in the E32, along with the E34 5 Series. The 4.0 litre version powered the new 740i/iL models, and the 3.0 litre version was sold in parallel with the M30 straight-six in the 730i/iL models. Both V8 engines were coupled to a new, 5-speed automatic transmission made by ZF. The Nikasil bore lining used in the M60 engine was prone to damage when used with high-sulfur fuels.

Styling 
The E32 was the first BMW to use L-shaped tail-lights, which were designed with safety of following traffic in mind. Other styling features include a Hofmeister kink in the rear window line and circular headlights.

A narrow 'kidney' grille correlated with 6-cylinder models, and a wider grille was standard for  V8 and V12 models. The narrow grille was available as an option on the 8- and 12-cylinder E32 models.

Models 
The official specifications are as follows.

* uncatalyzed 
** Electronically limited top speed

Alpina models 

The Alpina B11 3.5 is based on the E32 735i and introduced in 1987 with a  inline-six engine. Between 1987 and 1993 a total of 332 cars were produced.

Just 7 cars were made in 1993 and 1994.

A total of 305 cars were made.

Special models

750iL Highline

The BMW 750iL Highline was the top-of-the-line model of the E32, with lots of added luxury for the rear passengers like full leather seats, dual radio controls, dual climate control with coolbox mounted in the center console, electrically heated and adjustable rear seats, walnut veneer folding tables, two crystal glasses neatly placed in the coolbox, legrests, and sun shade all around the rear/side windows. Complete with independent heating and ventilation, it also added a second battery in the trunk and a second alternator to provide power for all these luxuries. The 'Highline' option package cost more than 20,000 DM, and was only available on the 750iL, bringing the total price to well over twice that of a base model 730i.

Goldfisch prototype

The Goldfisch, also called the 767 or the "Secret Seven" internally, is a concept full size luxury car based on the E32 750i. Conceived by Dr. Karlheinz Lange in the late 1980s, it was meant to be the top-of-the line variant of the 7 Series also designed to compete with offerings from rival Mercedes-Benz. Dr. Lange also involved two other employees in the project, namely Adolf Fischer and Hanns-Peter Weisbarth both being senior employees. The concept car was completed in just six months. The main notable feature is the V16 engine designed by Adolf Fischer, which is essentially a modified M70 V12 enlarged to have four extra cylinders, capacity enlarged to 6.7-litres, etched iron pistons, nine-bearing crankshaft and having silicone-aluminium casting. The engine was fitted with Bosch DME 3.3 engine management system for better performance. Desired level of performance was achieved when the system treated the engine as two inline-8 engines bolted together. Power was sent to the rear wheels via a 6-speed manual transmission shared with the E31 8 Series. The car had the engine cooling system located in the boot along with fabricated fibre glass gills and air scoops at the rear to aid in cooling as there was no space to accommodate them at the front as the resulting engine was  longer than the V12 engine. Air was expelled through a custom made valence panel at the rear of the car which led to the use of small tail lights with no fog and reverse lights. Despite the usage of a large V16 engine, the car was only  heavier than the 750i. The car remained a technology demonstrator only and was never put into production due to the V16 engine being incompliant to the environmental regulations.

Related cars
The E34 5 Series, introduced in 1988, has exterior design almost identical to the E32. It also uses the same M30 straight-6 and M60 V8 engines, and several other parts.

The E31 8 Series, introduced in 1989, uses the same M60 V8 and M70 V12 engines as the E32.

References

7 Series
E32
Sedans
Full-size vehicles
Luxury vehicles
Rear-wheel-drive vehicles
Cars introduced in 1986
1990s cars
Cars discontinued in 1994